Beaufort Academy (BA) is a private school for kindergarten through 12th grade, located in Lady's Island, South Carolina, United States. The school enrolls about 250 students, with an average class size of 16. Beaufort Academy is an accredited member of the Southern Association of Independent Schools (SAIS-SACS).

History
Beaufort Academy was founded in 1966 on Lady's Island, South Carolina. It was established as a segregation academy in response to the court-ordered integration of public schools. The school's tax exemption was revoked by the Internal Revenue Service after it declined to document that it had a racially nondiscriminatory admissions policy.

Campus
The campus sits on  acres of land, and is located on Sams Point Road.

References

Private elementary schools in South Carolina
Private middle schools in South Carolina
Private high schools in South Carolina
Educational institutions established in 1966
Schools in Beaufort County, South Carolina
1966 establishments in South Carolina
Segregation academies in South Carolina